Pedro Martínez de Eulate Maestresalas, know also as Martínez de Eulate or Eulate  (born 17 August 1979), is a Basque pelota player of hand modality, plays on defense, winner of two doubles tournaments.

Double hand-pelota championship finals

References

1979 births
Living people
People from Estella Oriental
Pelotaris from Navarre
Spanish pelotaris